The SS Regina  was a cargo ship built for the Merchant Mutual Line and home ported in Montreal, Quebec.

The ship sank during the Great Lakes Storm of 1913 after taking great damage. Lost for more than a half century, she became known as the "Great Mystery of the Great Storm of the Great Lakes". Since found, she has become an active dive site for scuba divers and is now part of Michigan's underwater Preserve system.

Description
The ship was powered by two Scotch boilers providing steam pressure to a triple-expansion steam engine turning one screw.

History
In 1907, Regina was built in Dumbarton, Scotland by A. McMillian & Son with the yard number 419. The order was placed by C.H.F. Plummer of Montreal, Quebec. The vessel was launched on September 4, 1907 and completed in October. The ship was initially registered in Glasgow, Scotland.   In 1912 ownership was transferred to the Canadian Lake Transportation Company and in 1913 it was transferred to the Canadian Steamship Lines Incorporated (CSL), and the ship was re-registered in Toronto, Ontario. Regina was used as part of the package freight business by CSL, delivering a variety of cargoes to various ports along the Great Lakes.

Sinking

On November 9, 1913 Regina was heading north from Point Edward, Ontario on Lake Huron. During the night one of the worst storms in Great Lakes history arose. At the time, Regina was carrying a varied cargo, with destinations set for ten ports. Among the cargo included enough canned goods to fill eight railroad cars, 140 tons of baled hay and stacked atop the upper deck were sewer and gas pipes.

During the storm the captain initially attempted to get to safe harbor. After anchoring, Regina capsized and sank. Later investigation of the ship's wreck found that the ship had run aground and had suffered a large hole near the cargo hold and several dents. Near Port Franks, Ontario, two bodies were found with a capsized lifeboat from Regina and another ten bodies were found on the beach a short distance away. There were no survivors from Regina.

However, this theory was dismissed after Charles S. Price was found capsized on Lake Huron; a diver confirmed that the ship was Charles S. Price and that the ship showed no signs of being in a collision.

Aftermath 

Twelve ships foundered in the Great Lakes Storm of 1913, and there was confusion in determining where the shipwrecks were located. The day following the storm - November 10, 1913 - a huge steel freighter was discovered floating bottom side up on Lake Huron. The bow was about  clear of the water, but the stern dipped underwater to such a degree that it was impossible to tell the length of the carrier. Every visible part of the hulk was coated with ice and there were no identifying marks in view. Originally, people assumed this vessel was Regina, as the visible length seemed to correspond to the size of the missing freighter. It was not until early on the morning of November 15 that the ship was identified as Charles S. Price, shortly before she sank on November 17. The front page of that day's Port Huron Times-Herald extra edition read, "BOAT IS PRICE — DIVER IS BAKER — SECRET KNOWN."

Discovery and salvage 
The wreck of Regina was discovered in 1986 in Lake Huron between Lexington and Port Sanilac, Michigan. She was discovered by Wayne Brusate, Colette Witherspoon, Garry Biniecki and John Severance. During a 1987 archaeological salvage expedition led by underwater archaeologist and shipwreck expert E. Lee Spence, tens of thousands of artifacts, including hundreds of intact bottles of still potable Scotch and champagne were recovered. Brusate and other divers made more than 400 dives on the wreck with permission from the Michigan State Department of Natural Resources, the Secretary of State and the United States Army Corps of Engineers, recovering an estimated 1% of the wreck's artifacts. The state and museums were given first choice of the artifacts, with Brusate keeping those unwanted items. In 2013, further artifacts were donated by Brusate to museums for display.

See also

References

Sources 

 

Merchant ships of Canada
Shipwrecks of Lake Huron
Maritime incidents in 1913
1907 ships
Ships built on the River Clyde
Canada Steamship Lines
Ships lost with all hands
Great Lakes freighters
Wreck diving sites in the United States